Dongluo (zhuang: Dunghloz Cin) is a town under the administration of Fusui County in southern Guangxi Zhuang Autonomous Region, China. , it had an area of  populated by 41,000 people residing in 9 villages. 94% of the people belong to the Zhuang ethnic group.

Administrative divisions
There are 9 villages:

Villages:
 Dongluo (东罗村), Kelan (客兰村), Douchong (都充村), Nalian (那练村), Cenfan (岑凡村), Qukan (渠坎村), Bayang (岜羊村), Dongdou (东斗村), Houzhai (厚寨村)

See also
List of township-level divisions of Guangxi

References

External links
  Dongluo Town/Official website of  Dongluo

Towns of Guangxi
Fusui County